Inocente José Carreño (28 December 1919 – 29 June 2016) was a Venezuelan composer and academic. He won the Venezuelan National Prize for Music in 1989.

Carreño died 29 June 2016, aged 96.

See also 
Venezuela
Venezuelan music

References 
Inocente Carreño by Carolina Rodríguez - ISCM-Venezuela
Venezuela Symphony orchestra Magazine, 25th anniversary, 1955.

1919 births
2016 deaths
People from Nueva Esparta
Venezuelan classical composers
Venezuelan male composers
20th-century classical composers
21st-century classical composers
20th-century male musicians
21st-century male musicians